Gemmula garviei is an extinct species of sea snail, a marine gastropod mollusk in the family Turridae, the turrids.

Description

Distribution
Fossils of this marine species have been found in Eocene strata in Cotentin, France.

References

 Tracey S., Craig B. & Gain O. (2019). Turridae (Gastropoda, Conoidea) from the late Lutetian Eocene of the Cotentin, NW France: endemism through loss of planktotrophy?. Carnets de Voyages Paléontologiques dans le Bassin Anglo-Parisien. 5: 101-140

garviei
Gastropods described in 2019